The Montenegro national rugby team, known as the Wolves (Vukovi), represents Montenegro in rugby union. The sport of rugby has only come recently to the country since its independence in 2006. The squad plays in red and gold jerseys with red shorts, and their emblem is the double headed eagle while their logo is the wolf. Montenegro are currently in ENC 3 (European Nations Cup 3rd Division) for rugby union, competing for the first time as an independent country. The team was first guided and coached by Marty Lusty.

Current squad
Note: Flags indicate national union as has been defined under World Rugby eligibility rules. Players may hold more than one nationality. Rugby clubs are in brackets.

 01  Marštjepović Đorde (RK Mornar Bar)
 02  Miždalo Bojan (RFC Arsenal Tivat)
 03  Radović Milan (Vichy)
 04  Mirko Garčević (RK Podgorica)
 05  Aleksandar Milosavljević (RK Podgorica)
 06  Aleksandar Roganović (RK Nikšić)
 07  Ćavor Lazar (Northwood Boys High)
 08  Boris Mijušković (RK Nikšić) Captain
 09  Nikola Jovanović (RFC Arsenal Tivat)
 10  Popović Srđan (RFC Arsenal Tivat)
 11  Damjan Čelebic (RK Podgorica)
 12  Dušan Vučićević (Germany)  
 13  Marko Kuč (RK Podgorica)
 14  Boško Mirjačić (RK Nikšić)
 15  Marko Andrić (RK Podgorica)
 16  Stanković Duško (RK Nikšić)
 17  Popović Željko (RK Cetinje)
 18  Jelić Ivan (RK Podgorica)
 19  Marko Kovačević (RK Cetinje)
 20  Vladan Čelebić (RK Podgorica)
 21  Ivan Colaković (RK Cetinje)
 22  Igor Adzaip (RFC Arsenal Tivat)
 23  Novica Raonić (RK Nikšić)

*squad and extended squad against Turkey 28 April 2018

Record

Overall

See also
 Rugby union in Montenegro
 Montenegrin Rugby Union
 2014–16 European Nations Cup Third Division
 List of National Team Players

References

External links
 Montenegro Rugby Official Site
 List of National Team Players

Rugby union
Teams in European Nations Cup (rugby union)
European national rugby union teams
Rugby union in Montenegro